Ulf-Peter Ivar Rådberg (born 1956) is a Swedish politician and former member of the Riksdag, the national legislature. A member of the Green Party, he represented Västra Götaland County North between October 2006 and September 2014. He was also a substitute member of the Riksdag for Barbro Feltzing twice: between April 2005 and June 2005; and between November 2005 and May 2006.

References

1956 births
Living people
Members of the Riksdag 2006–2010
Members of the Riksdag 2010–2014
Members of the Riksdag from the Green Party